Pāpāmoa College is a state coeducational Year 7–13 secondary school located in the eponymous eastern suburb of Tauranga, New Zealand. The school opened in February 2011 as the city's fifth state secondary school, serving the growing Papamoa area.

History
The Government purchased the Pāpāmoa College site in 1999. The school was gazetted by the Education Minister, Anne Tolley, on 27 May 2009. Construction of the school began in October 2009, and cost $27.7 million.

Pāpāmoa College opened for the first time in February 2011, initially taking only Year 7–9 students. The school was officially opened on 15 April 2011, with Minister Tolley, Tauranga mayor Stuart Crosby, and local MP Tony Ryall in attendance. Additional school years opened as the 2011 Year 9 students moved through. The final year, Year 13, opened at the beginning of 2015.

Enrolment
At the July 2012 Education Review Office (ERO) review of the school, Pāpāmoa College had 603 students enrolled. The school roll's gender composition was 51% male and 49% female, and its ethnic composition was 56% New Zealand European (Pākehā), 26% Māori, 12% other European, 3% Indian, 2% other Asian, and 1% Pacific Islanders.

References

External links 
 School website
 Education Review Office (ERO) reports

Educational institutions established in 2011
Secondary schools in the Bay of Plenty Region
Schools in Tauranga
2011 establishments in New Zealand